Russell Stewart (born 25 January 1946) is a New Zealand former cricketer. He played seventeen first-class matches for Otago between 1973 and 1978.

See also
 List of Otago representative cricketers

References

External links
 

1946 births
Living people
New Zealand cricketers
Otago cricketers
Cricketers from Dunedin